American rapper Macklemore has released three studio albums and two mixtapes as a solo artist. The origin of the name Macklemore is from when Haggerty attended Nathan Hale High School and was required to invent a superhero for an art project. At the beginning of his musical career, he recorded an EP titled Open Your Eyes in 2000 under the name Professor Macklemore, which he distributed himself. This initial work of his was also considered a mixtape, as some of the songs on this EP were written separately. His only official mixtape, The Unplanned Mixtape, released in 2009, consisted of ten songs. Macklemore dropped "Professor" from his name, and released his first official full-length album, The Language of My World in January 2005. He appeared as a featured artist on The Physics' song "Good" in 2009. In 2008, 2009, and 2011, Macklemore performed at Bumbershoot, a major arts and music festival in Seattle. In 2009 he released The Unplanned Mixtape, which reached No. 7 on iTunes.  Macklemore's debut single "The Town" was released from The Unplanned Mixtape and later remixed by Sabzi of the Blue Scholars. In 2017, he released his second studio album Gemini, which reached No. 2 on the US Billboard 200.

Albums

Studio albums

Mixtapes

Singles

As lead artist

As featured artist

Promotional singles

Other charted songs

Other appearances

Music videos

Notes

References

External links
 Official website
 Macklemore at AllMusic
 
 

People from Mountlake Terrace, Washington
Discographies of American artists
Hip hop discographies